Filayeva is a rural locality (a village) in Leninskoye Rural Settlement, Kudymkarsky District, Perm Krai, Russia. The population was 12 as of 2010.

Geography 
Filayeva is located 47 km south of Kudymkar (the district's administrative centre) by road. Parfenova is the nearest rural locality.

References 

Rural localities in Kudymkarsky District